The Nanjing Qixiashan Yangtze River Bridge, formerly Fourth Nanjing Yangtze Bridge, is a suspension bridge over the Yangtze River in Nanjing, China. The bridge is the 11th longest span in the world and the sixth largest in China. The bridge has renamed on 20 December 2019.

Jiangsu province's first suspension bridge, it lies 10 km downstream of the second Yangtze River Bridge. The bridge connects Hengliang town, a section of Nanjing Raoyue, Nanjing-Nantong Highway, Hongguang village, towns like Long Pao, Xianling and Qilin in Jiangning District, and a section of Raoyue and Shanghai-Nanjing Highway.

The 4th Nanjing Yangtze twin-tower bridge fashioned after standard expressway, boasts dual six-lane carriageway designed to maintain a 100–125 km an hour traffic.

See also
 List of bridges in China
List of longest suspension bridge spans
List of tallest bridges in the world
List of largest bridges in China
Yangtze River bridges and tunnels

References

External links

Bridges in Jiangsu
Suspension bridges in China
Bridges over the Yangtze River
Bridges completed in 2012